The Chinese Elm cultivar Ulmus parvifolia 'Select 380' was  tested in the United States for cold-hardiness. The name is considered invalid by some for want of fuller description.

Description
Not available.

Pests and diseases
The species and its cultivars are highly resistant, but not immune, to Dutch elm disease, and unaffected by the Elm Leaf Beetle Xanthogaleruca luteola.

Cultivation
It is not known (2006) whether the tree is, or has ever been, in commercial cultivation.

Accessions
None known.

References

Chinese elm cultivar
Ulmus articles missing images
Ulmus